The FIA World Cup for Cross-Country Rallies was a rally raid series organised by the FIA, culminating with a champion driver, co-driver, and team; with additional trophies awarded to T2 and T3 drivers & teams.

Starting with the 2011 season, the previous FIA Cross-Country Rally World Cup was joined with the FIA's International Cup for Cross-Country Bajas to form the new competition. From the beginning of the 2019 season the cup was once again split, with the FIA World Cup for Cross Country Bajas being held alongside the competition for "baja" style rally raids.

From 2022, the cup merged with the FIM Cross-Country Rallies World Championship to become the World Rally-Raid Championship.

Champions

See also
Rally raid

References

External links
  official website
 
 Reports about the Series

 
Cross Country Rally World Cup
Cross Country Rally World Cup
Recurring sporting events established in 1993